The first season of The Rockford Files originally aired Fridays at 9:00-10:00 pm on NBC from September 13, 1974 to March 7, 1975. James Garner was 46 at the time of airing.

Episodes

1974 American television seasons
1975 American television seasons
The Rockford Files seasons